Romain Del Castillo (born 29 March 1996) is a French professional footballer who plays for Brest as an attacking midfielder.

Club career

Lyon
Del Castillo is a youth exponent from Lyon. He made his Ligue 1 debut at 20 November 2015 against OGC Nice replacing Sergi Darder after 64 minutes in a 3–0 away defeat.

Del Castillo was loaned to Football Bourg-en-Bresse Péronnas 01 for the 2016–17 season, and after a successful season was loaned again to Nîmes Olympique in September 2017 for the 2017–18 season.

Rennes
On 20 June 2018, Del Castillo signed a four-year deal with fellow Ligue 1 side Rennes who agreed a €2 million transfer fee with Lyon.

Brest
On 31 August 2021, Del Castillo signed with fellow Breton side Brest.

International career
Del Castillo was born in France, and is of Spanish descent through his paternal grandparents. He is a youth international for France, and represented the France U21s in a 2–0 win over the Montenegro U21s on 27 March 2018.

Career statistics

Club

Honours
Rennes
Coupe de France: 2018–19

References

External links
 
 

Living people
1996 births
People from Vénissieux
French people of Spanish descent
Sportspeople from Lyon Metropolis
French footballers
Footballers from Auvergne-Rhône-Alpes
Association football midfielders
France youth international footballers
Ligue 1 players
Ligue 2 players
Olympique Lyonnais players
Football Bourg-en-Bresse Péronnas 01 players
Nîmes Olympique players
Stade Rennais F.C. players
Stade Brestois 29 players